Richard Morant (30 October 1945 – 9 November 2011) was an English actor.

Biography

Morant was born in Shipston-on-Stour, Warwickshire. His father was Shakespearean actor Philip Morant (1909–1993). His sister is actress Angela Morant. He was also a nephew of actors Bill and Linden Travers, and a cousin of actress Penelope Wilton. He trained at the Central School of Speech and Drama before joining the Prospect Theatre Company, and touring with Ian McKellen in Richard II, Edward II and Twelfth Night. 

He enjoyed a long television and theatrical career, first creating an impression as the bully Flashman in a BBC adaptation of the Thomas Hughes novel, Tom Brown's Schooldays (1971), and had a starring role in Thames Television's Armchair Theatre play Verité (1972) and followed this up with a regular role as Dr Dwight Enys in the popular BBC series of Poldark (1975).

Morant also appeared in several BBC classic serials, including adaptations of Walter Scott's Woodstock (1973), as the future Charles II, and The Talisman (1980), as Conrade of Montserrat.

He played Maximilien Robespierre in The Scarlet Pimpernel (1982), and he later played Mervyn Bunter, the valet of Lord Peter Wimsey, in A Dorothy L. Sayers Mystery, the BBC's 1987 productions of Strong Poison, Have His Carcase and Gaudy Night (all based on Dorothy Sayers's original novels). In 1988 he played Theodore Dyke Acland in the serial Jack the Ripper.

His film career included roles in Zeppelin (1971), Mahler (1974), The Company of Wolves (1984), The Second Victory (1986), Scandal (1989) and Janice Beard (1999).

His stage appearances included a starring role in Noël Coward's Private Lives at the Theatre Royal, Bath in 1984. The following year he co-starred with Stephanie Beacham and Pam Ferris in ITV's rag-trade soap drama, Connie. He also did voice-over, radio, and audio book work including voicing books by Julian Barnes and Julian Fellowes.

Personal life
Morant's first wife was Melissa Fairbanks, a daughter of Douglas Fairbanks Jr., with whom he had a son and daughter. His second wife was Valerie Buchanan, with whom he had another son and daughter.

He had a sideline as a dealer in Asian carpets and textiles, including running his own gallery in Notting Hill. In 2005 he became the sole owner of an established company specialising in carpets and fine textiles, headquartered in Notting Hill, London. After suffering a short illness, Morant died suddenly of an aneurism on 9 November 2011, aged 66.

Filmography

References

External links

Richard Morant Commissioned Carpets and Design
Notice of death
Robin Ellis remembers fellow actor Richard Morant

English male stage actors
English male television actors
People from Shipston-on-Stour
1945 births
2011 deaths
English male film actors
Alumni of the Royal Central School of Speech and Drama